Cristal R. Nell (July 7, 1978 – July 24, 2020)
was an American bridge player. She was a national champion.
She was known for dressing up to play Bridge.

Bridge accomplishments

Wins

 North American Bridge Championships (1)
 Rockwell Mixed Pairs (1) 2017

Notes

External links

1978 births
2020 deaths
American contract bridge players